Phagophilia or phagophily is feeding on parasites.

German zoologist M. Beier reported that phagophilia is the feeding behavior of some pseudoscorpions. It was reported that many pseudoscorpions species co-exist with some packrat species, and two of them feed on packrat ectoparasites, to mutual benefit. This is an example of a Cleaning symbiosis.

References

Eating behaviors